Jalāl al-Dīn Muḥammad Rūmī, also known as Jalāl al-Dīn Muḥammad Balkhī, Mevlânâ/Mawlānā and Mevlevî/Mawlawī, but more popularly known simply as Rumi (30 September 1207 – 17 December 1273), was a 13th-century Persian poet, Hanafi faqih, Islamic scholar, Maturidi theologian and Sufi mystic originally from Greater Khorasan in Greater Iran. Rumi's influence transcends national borders and ethnic divisions: Iranians, Kurds, Tajiks, Turks, Greeks, Pashtuns, other Central Asian Muslims, as well as Muslims of the Indian subcontinent have greatly appreciated his spiritual legacy for the past seven centuries.  His poems have been widely translated into many of the world's languages and transposed into various formats. Rumi has been described as the "most popular poet" and the "best selling poet" in the United States.

Rumi's works are written mostly in Persian, but occasionally he also used Turkish, Arabic and Greek in his verse. His Masnavi (Mathnawi), composed in Konya, is considered one of the greatest poems of the Persian language. His works are widely read today in their original language across Greater Iran and the Persian-speaking world. Translations of his works are very popular, most notably in Turkey, Azerbaijan, the United States and South Asia. His poetry has influenced not only Persian literature, but also the literary traditions of the Ottoman Turkish, Chagatai, Kurdish, Urdu, Bengali and Pashto languages.

Name
He is most commonly called Rumi in English. His full name is given by his contemporary Sipahsalar as Muhammad bin Muhammad bin al-Husayn al-Khatibi al-Balkhi al-Bakri. He is more commonly known as Jalāl ad-Dīn Muḥammad Rūmī. Jalal ad-Din is an Arabic name meaning "Glory of the Faith". Balkhī and Rūmī are his nisbas, meaning, respectively, "from Balkh" and "from Rûm" ('Roman,' what European history now calls Byzantine Anatolia). According to the authoritative Rumi biographer Franklin Lewis of the University of Chicago, "[t]he Anatolian peninsula which had belonged to the Byzantine, or eastern Roman empire, had only relatively recently been conquered by Muslims and even when it came to be controlled by Turkish Muslim rulers, it was still known to Arabs, Persians and Turks as the geographical area of Rum. As such, there are a number of historical personages born in or associated with Anatolia known as Rumi, a word borrowed from Arabic literally meaning 'Roman,' in which context Roman refers to subjects of the Byzantine Empire or simply to people living in or things associated with Anatolia." He was also known as "Mullah of Rum" ( mullā-yi Rūm or  mullā-yi Rūmī).

Mawlānā is a term of Arabic origin, meaning "our master".

Life

Overview
Rumi was born to native Persian-speaking parents, in Wakhsh, a village on the Vakhsh River in present-day Tajikistan. The area, culturally adjacent to Balkh, is where Mawlânâ's father, Bahâ' uddîn Walad, was a preacher and jurist. He lived and worked there until 1212, when he moved to Samarkand.

Greater Balkh was at that time a major centre of Persian culture and Sufism had developed there for several centuries. The most important influences upon Rumi, besides his father, were the Persian poets Attar and Sanai. Rumi expresses his appreciation: "Attar was the spirit, Sanai his eyes twain, And in time thereafter, Came we in their train" and mentions in another poem: "Attar has traversed the seven cities of Love, We are still at the turn of one street". His father was also connected to the spiritual lineage of Najm al-Din Kubra.

Rumi lived most of his life under the Persianate Seljuk Sultanate of Rum, where he produced his works and died in 1273AD. He was buried in Konya, and his shrine became a place of pilgrimage. Upon his death, his followers and his son Sultan Walad founded the Mevlevi Order, also known as the Order of the Whirling Dervishes, famous for the Sufi dance known as the Sama ceremony. He was laid to rest beside his father, and over his remains a shrine was erected. A hagiographical account of him is described in Shams ud-Din Ahmad Aflāki's Manāqib ul-Ārifīn (written between 1318 and 1353). This biography needs to be treated with care as it contains both legends and facts about Rumi. For example, Professor Franklin Lewis of the University of Chicago, author of the most complete biography on Rumi, has separate sections for the hagiographical biography of Rumi and the actual biography about him.

Childhood and emigration
Rumi's father was Bahā ud-Dīn Walad, a theologian, jurist and a mystic from Wakhsh, who was also known by the followers of Rumi as Sultan al-Ulama or "Sultan of the Scholars". According to Sultan Walad's Ibadetname and Shamsuddin Aflaki (c.1286 to 1291), Rumi was a descendant of Abu Bakr. Some modern scholars, however, reject this claim and state it does not hold on closer examination. The claim of maternal descent from the Khwarazmshah for Rumi or his father is also seen as a non-historical hagiographical tradition designed to connect the family with royalty, but this claim is rejected for chronological and historical reasons. The most complete genealogy offered for the family stretches back to six or seven generations to famous Hanafi jurists.

We do not learn the name of Baha al-Din's mother in the sources, only that he referred to her as "Māmi" (colloquial Persian for Māma), and that she was a simple woman who lived to the 1200s. The mother of Rumi was Mu'mina Khātūn. The profession of the family for several generations was that of Islamic preachers of the relatively liberal Hanafi Maturidi school, and this family tradition was continued by Rumi (see his Fihi Ma Fih and Seven Sermons) and Sultan Walad (see Ma'rif Waladi for examples of his everyday sermons and lectures).

When the Mongols invaded Central Asia sometime between 1215 and 1220, Baha ud-Din Walad, with his whole family and a group of disciples, set out westwards. According to hagiographical account which is not agreed upon by all Rumi scholars, Rumi encountered one of the most famous mystic Persian poets, Attar, in the Iranian city of Nishapur, located in the province of Khorāsān. Attar immediately recognized Rumi's spiritual eminence. He saw the father walking ahead of the son and said, "Here comes a sea followed by an ocean." Attar gave the boy his Asrārnāma, a book about the entanglement of the soul in the material world. This meeting had a deep impact on the eighteen-year-old Rumi and later on became the inspiration for his works.

From Nishapur, Walad and his entourage set out for Baghdad, meeting many of the scholars and Sufis of the city. From Baghdad they went to Hejaz and performed the pilgrimage at Mecca. The migrating caravan then passed through Damascus, Malatya, Erzincan, Sivas, Kayseri and Nigde. They finally settled in Karaman for seven years; Rumi's mother and brother both died there. In 1225, Rumi married Gowhar Khatun in Karaman. They had two sons: Sultan Walad and Ala-eddin Chalabi. When his wife died, Rumi married again and had a son, Amir Alim Chalabi, and a daughter, Malakeh Khatun.

On 1 May 1228, most likely as a result of the insistent invitation of 'Alā' ud-Dīn Key-Qobād, ruler of Anatolia, Baha' ud-Din came and finally settled in Konya in Anatolia within the westernmost territories of the Seljuk Sultanate of Rûm.

Education and encounters with Shams-e Tabrizi
Baha' ud-Din became the head of a madrassa (religious school) and when he died, Rumi, aged twenty-five, inherited his position as the Islamic molvi. One of Baha' ud-Din's students, Sayyed Burhan ud-Din Muhaqqiq Termazi, continued to train Rumi in the Shariah as well as the Tariqa, especially that of Rumi's father. For nine years, Rumi practised Sufism as a disciple of Burhan ud-Din until the latter died in 1240 or 1241. Rumi's public life then began: he became an Islamic Jurist, issuing fatwas and giving sermons in the mosques of Konya. He also served as a Molvi (Islamic teacher) and taught his adherents in the madrassa.

During this period, Rumi also travelled to Damascus and is said to have spent four years there.

It was his meeting with the dervish Shams-e Tabrizi on 15 November 1244 that completely changed his life. From an accomplished teacher and jurist, Rumi was transformed into an ascetic.

Shams had travelled throughout the Middle East searching and praying for someone who could "endure my company". A voice said to him, "What will you give in return?" Shams replied, "My head!" The voice then said, "The one you seek is Jalal ud-Din of Konya." On the night of 5 December 1248, as Rumi and Shams were talking, Shams was called to the back door. He went out, never to be seen again. It is rumoured that Shams was murdered with the connivance of Rumi's son, 'Ala' ud-Din; if so, Shams indeed gave his head for the privilege of mystical friendship.

Rumi's love for, and his bereavement at the death of, Shams found their expression in an outpouring of lyric poems, Divan-e Shams-e Tabrizi. He himself went out searching for Shams and journeyed again to Damascus. There, he realised:

Later life and death

Mewlana had been spontaneously composing ghazals (Persian poems), and these had been collected in the Divan-i Kabir or Diwan Shams Tabrizi. Rumi found another companion in Salaḥ ud-Din-e Zarkub, a goldsmith. After Salah ud-Din's death, Rumi's scribe and favourite student, Hussam-e Chalabi, assumed the role of Rumi's companion. One day, the two of them were wandering through the Meram vineyards outside Konya when Hussam described to Rumi an idea he had had: "If you were to write a book like the Ilāhīnāma of Sanai or the Mantiq ut-Tayr of 'Attar, it would become the companion of many troubadours. They would fill their hearts from your work and compose music to accompany it." Rumi smiled and took out a piece of paper on which were written the opening eighteen lines of his Masnavi, beginning with:

Hussam implored Rumi to write more. Rumi spent the next twelve years of his life in Anatolia dictating the six volumes of this masterwork, the Masnavi, to Hussam.

In December 1273, Rumi fell ill; he predicted his own death and composed the well-known ghazal, which begins with the verse:

Rumi died on 17 December 1273 in Konya. His death was mourned by the diverse community of Konya, with local Christians and Jews joining the crowd that converged to bid farewell as his body was carried through the city. Rumi's body was interred beside that of his father, and a splendid shrine, the Yeşil Türbe (Green Tomb, قبه الخضراء; today the Mevlâna Museum), was erected over his place of burial. His epitaph reads:

Georgian princess and Seljuq queen Gurju Khatun was a close friend of Rumi. She was the one who sponsored the construction of his tomb in Konya. The 13th century Mevlâna Mausoleum, with its mosque, dance hall, schools and living quarters for dervishes, remains a destination of pilgrimage to this day, and is probably the most popular pilgrimage site to be regularly visited by adherents of every major religion.

Teachings

Like other mystic and Sufi poets of Persian literature, Rumi's poetry speaks of love which infuses the world. Rumi's teachings also express the tenets summarized in the Quranic verse which Shams-e Tabrizi cited as the essence of prophetic guidance: "Know that ‘There is no god but He,’ and ask forgiveness for your sin" (Q. 47:19). In the interpretation attributed to Shams, the first part of the verse commands the humanity to seek knowledge of tawhid (oneness of God), while the second instructs them to negate their own existence. In Rumi's terms, tawhid is lived most fully through love, with the connection being made explicit in his verse that describes love as "that flame which, when it blazes up, burns away everything except the Everlasting Beloved." Rumi's longing and desire to attain this ideal is evident in the following poem from his book the Masnavi:

The Masnavi weaves fables, scenes from everyday life, Qur'anic revelations and exegesis, and metaphysics into a vast and intricate tapestry.

Rumi believed passionately in the use of music, poetry and dance as a path for reaching God. For Rumi, music helped devotees to focus their whole being on the divine and to do this so intensely that the soul was both destroyed and resurrected. It was from these ideas that the practice of whirling Dervishes developed into a ritual form. His teachings became the base for the order of the Mevlevi, which his son Sultan Walad organised. Rumi encouraged Sama, listening to music and turning or doing the sacred dance. In the Mevlevi tradition, samāʿ represents a mystical journey of spiritual ascent through mind and love to the Perfect One. In this journey, the seeker symbolically turns towards the truth, grows through love, abandons the ego, finds the truth and arrives at the Perfect. The seeker then returns from this spiritual journey, with greater maturity, to love and to be of service to the whole of creation without discrimination with regard to beliefs, races, classes and nations.

In other verses in the Masnavi, Rumi describes in detail the universal message of love:

Rumi's favourite musical instrument was the ney (reed flute).

Major works

Rumi's poetry is often divided into various categories: the quatrains (rubayāt) and odes (ghazal) of the Divan, the six books of the Masnavi. The prose works are divided into The Discourses, The Letters, and the Seven Sermons.

Poetic works

 Rumi's best-known work is the Maṭnawīye Ma'nawī (Spiritual Couplets). The six-volume poem holds a distinguished place within the rich tradition of Persian Sufi literature, and has been commonly called "the Quran in Persian". Many commentators have regarded it as the greatest mystical poem in world literature. It contains approximately 27,000 lines, each consisting of a couplet with an internal rhyme. While the mathnawi genre of poetry may use a variety of different metres, after Rumi composed his poem, the metre he used became the mathnawi metre par excellence. The first recorded use of this metre for a mathnawi poem took place at the Nizari Ismaili fortress of Girdkuh between 1131–1139. It likely set the stage for later poetry in this style by mystics such as Attar and Rumi.

 Rumi's other major work is the Dīwān-e Kabīr (Great Work) or Dīwān-e Shams-e Tabrīzī (The Works of Shams of Tabriz), named in honour of Rumi's master Shams. Besides approximately 35000 Persian couplets and 2000 Persian quatrains, the Divan contains 90 Ghazals and 19 quatrains in Arabic, a couple of dozen or so couplets in Turkish (mainly macaronic poems of mixed Persian and Turkish) and 14 couplets in Greek (all of them in three macaronic poems of Greek-Persian).

Prose works
 Fihi Ma Fihi (In It What's in It, Persian: فیه ما فیه) provides a record of seventy-one talks and lectures given by Rumi on various occasions to his disciples. It was compiled from the notes of his various disciples, so Rumi did not author the work directly. An English translation from the Persian was first published by A.J. Arberry as Discourses of Rumi (New York: Samuel Weiser, 1972), and a translation of the second book by Wheeler Thackston, Sign of the Unseen (Putney, VT: Threshold Books, 1994). The style of the Fihi ma fihi is colloquial and meant for middle-class men and women, and lack the sophisticated wordplay.
 Majāles-e Sab'a (Seven Sessions,) contains seven Persian sermons (as the name implies) or lectures given in seven different assemblies. The sermons themselves give a commentary on the deeper meaning of Qur'an and Hadith. The sermons also include quotations from poems of Sana'i, 'Attar, and other poets, including Rumi himself. As Aflakī relates, after Shams-e Tabrīzī, Rumi gave sermons at the request of notables, especially Salāh al-Dīn Zarkūb. The style of Persian is rather simple, but quotation of Arabic and knowledge of history and the Hadith show Rumi's knowledge in the Islamic sciences. His style is typical of the genre of lectures given by Sufis and spiritual teachers.
 Makatib (The Letters, Persian: مکاتیب) or Maktubat is the collection of letters written in Persian by Rumi to his disciples, family members, and men of state and of influence. The letters testify that Rumi kept very busy helping family members and administering a community of disciples that had grown up around them. Unlike the Persian style of the previous two mentioned works (which are lectures and sermons), the letters are consciously sophisticated and epistolary in style, which is in conformity with the expectations of correspondence directed to nobles, statesmen and kings.

Religious outlook
Rumi belongs to the class of Islamic philosophers which include Ibn Arabi. These transcendental philosophers are often studied together in traditional schools of irfan, philosophy and theosophy throughout the Muslim world.

Rumi embeds his theosophy (transcendental philosophy) like a string through the beads of his poems and stories. His main point and emphasis is the unity of being.

It is undeniable that Rumi was a Muslim scholar and took Islam seriously. Nonetheless, the depth of his spiritual vision extended beyond narrow understanding sectarian concerns. One quatrain reads:

According to the Quran, Muhammad is a mercy sent by God. In regards to this, Rumi states:

"The Light of Muhammad does not abandon a Zoroastrian or Jew in the world. May the shade of his good fortune shine upon everyone! He brings all of those who are led astray into the Way out of the desert."

Rumi, however, asserts the supremacy of Islam by stating:

"The Light of Muhammad has become a thousand branches (of knowledge), a thousand, so that both this world and the next have been seized from end to end. If Muhammad rips the veil open from a single such branch, thousands of monks and priests will tear the string of false belief from around their waists."

Many of Rumi's poems suggest the importance of outward religious observance and the primacy of the Qur'an.

Rumi states:

I am the servant of the Qur'an as long as I have life.
I am the dust on the path of Muhammad, the Chosen one.
If anyone quotes anything except this from my sayings,
I am quit of him and outraged by these words.

Rumi also states:

On the first page of the Masnavi, Rumi states:
 "Hadha kitâbu 'l- mathnawîy wa huwa uSûlu uSûli uSûli 'd-dîn wa kashshâfu 'l-qur'ân."
"This is the book of the Masnavi, and it is the roots of the roots of the roots of the (Islamic) Religion and it is the Explainer of the Qur'ân."

Hadi Sabzavari, one of Iran's most important 19th-century philosophers, makes the following connection between the Masnavi and Islam, in the introduction to his philosophical commentary on the book:
It is a commentary on the versified exegesis [of the Qur’ān] and its occult mystery, since all of it [all of the Mathnawī] is, as you will see, an elucidation of the clear verses [of the Qur’ān], a clarification of prophetic utterances, a glimmer of the light of the luminous Qur’ān, and burning embers irradiating their rays from its shining lamp. As respects to hunting through the treasure-trove of the Qur’ān, one can find in it [the Mathnawī] all [the Qur’ān's] ancient philosophical wisdom; it [the Mathnawī] is all entirely eloquent philosophy. In truth, the pearly verse of the poem combines the Canon Law of Islam (sharīʿa) with the Sufi Path (ṭarīqa) and the Divine Reality (ḥaqīqa); the author's [Rūmī] achievement belongs to God in his bringing together of the Law (sharīʿa), the Path, and the Truth in a way that includes critical intellect, profound thought, a brilliant natural temperament, and integrity of character that is endowed with power, insight, inspiration, and illumination.

Seyyed Hossein Nasr states:
One of the greatest living authorities on Rûmî in Persia today, Hâdî Hâ'irî, has shown in an unpublished work that some 6,000 verses of the Dîwân and the Mathnawî are practically direct translations of Qur'ânic verses into Persian poetry.

Rumi states in his Dīwān:
The Sufi is hanging on to Muhammad, like Abu Bakr.

His Masnavi contains anecdotes and stories derived largely from the Quran and the hadith, as well as everyday tales.

Legacy

Universality
Shahram Shiva asserts that "Rumi is able to verbalise the highly personal and often confusing world of personal growth and development in a very clear and direct fashion. He does not offend anyone, and he includes everyone.... Today Rumi's poems can be heard in churches, synagogues, Zen monasteries, as well as in the downtown New York art/performance/music scene."

To many modern Westerners, his teachings are one of the best introductions to the philosophy and practice of Sufism. In the West Shahram Shiva has been teaching, performing and sharing the translations of the poetry of Rumi for nearly twenty years and has been instrumental in spreading Rumi's legacy in the English-speaking parts of the world.

According to Professor Majid M. Naini, "Rumi's life and transformation provide true testimony and proof that people of all religions and backgrounds can live together in peace and harmony. Rumi’s visions, words, and life teach us how to reach inner peace and happiness so we can finally stop the continual stream of hostility and hatred and achieve true global peace and harmony.”

Rumi's work has been translated into many of the world's languages, including Russian, German, Urdu, Turkish, Arabic, Bengali, French, Italian, and Spanish, and is being presented in a growing number of formats, including concerts, workshops, readings, dance performances, and other artistic creations. The English interpretations of Rumi's poetry by Coleman Barks have sold more than half a million copies worldwide, and Rumi is one of the most widely read poets in the United States. Shahram Shiva book "Rending the Veil: Literal and Poetic Translations of Rumi" (1995, HOHM Press) is the recipient of the Benjamin Franklin Award.

Recordings of Rumi poems have made it to the USA's Billboard's Top 20 list. A selection of American author Deepak Chopra's editing of the translations by Fereydoun Kia of Rumi's love poems has been performed by Hollywood personalities such as Madonna, Goldie Hawn, Philip Glass and Demi Moore.

Rumi and his mausoleum were depicted on the reverse of the 5000 Turkish lira banknotes of 1981–1994.

There is a famous landmark in Northern India, known as Rumi Gate, situated in Lucknow (the capital of Uttar Pradesh) named for Rumi. Indian filmmaker Muzaffar Ali who is from Lucknow made a documentary, titled Rumi in the Land of Khusrau (2001), which presents concerts based on the works of Rumi and Amir Khusrau and highlights parallels between the lives of the poets.

Iranian world

These cultural, historical and linguistic ties between Rumi and Iran have made Rumi an iconic Iranian poet, and some of the most important Rumi scholars including Foruzanfar, Naini, Sabzewari, etc., have come from modern Iran. Rumi's poetry is displayed on the walls of many cities across Iran, sung in Persian music, and read in school books.

Rumi's poetry forms the basis of much classical Iranian and Afghan music. Contemporary classical interpretations of his poetry are made by Muhammad Reza Shajarian, Shahram Nazeri, Davood Azad (the three from Iran) and Ustad Mohammad Hashem Cheshti (Afghanistan).

Mewlewī Sufi Order; Rumi and Turkey

The Mewlewī Sufi order was founded in 1273 by Rumi's followers after his death. His first successor could have been Salah-eddin Zarkoub who served Rumi for a decade and Rumi revered him highly in his poets. Zarkoub was illiterate and uttered some words incorrectly. Rumi used some of these incorrect words in his poems to express his support and humility towards Zarkoub. Rumi named him his successor but Zarkoub died sooner than him. So Rumi's first successor in the rectorship of the order was "Husam Chalabi", after whose death in 1284 Rumi's younger and only surviving son, Sultan Walad (died 1312), popularly known as author of the mystical Maṭnawī Rabābnāma, or the Book of the Rabab was installed as grand master of the order. The leadership of the order has been kept within Rumi's family in Konya uninterruptedly since then.
The Mewlewī Sufis, also known as Whirling Dervishes, believe in performing their dhikr in the form of Sama. During the time of Rumi (as attested in the Manāqib ul-Ārefīn of Aflākī), his followers gathered for musical and "turning" practices.

According to tradition, Rumi was himself a notable musician who played the robāb, although his favourite instrument was the ney or reed flute. The music accompanying the samāʿ consists of settings of poems from the Maṭnawī and Dīwān-e Kabīr, or of Sultan Walad's poems. The Mawlawīyah was a well-established Sufi order in the Ottoman Empire, and many of the members of the order served in various official positions of the Caliphate. The centre for the Mevlevi was in Konya. There is also a Mewlewī monastery (dargāh) in Istanbul near the Galata Tower in which the samāʿ is performed and accessible to the public. The Mewlewī order issues an invitation to people of all backgrounds:

During Ottoman times, the Mevlevi produced a number of notable poets and musicians, including Sheikh Ghalib, Ismail Rusuhi Dede of Ankara, Esrar Dede, Halet Efendi, and Gavsi Dede, who are all buried at the Galata Mewlewī Khāna (Turkish: Mevlevi-Hane) in Istanbul. Music, especially that of the ney, plays an important part in the Mevlevi.

With the foundation of the modern, secular Republic of Turkey, Mustafa Kemal Atatürk removed religion from the sphere of public policy and restricted it exclusively to that of personal morals, behaviour and faith. On 13 December 1925, a law was passed closing all the tekkes (dervish lodges) and zāwiyas (chief dervish lodges), and the centres of veneration to which visits (ziyārat) were made. Istanbul alone had more than 250 tekkes as well as small centres for gatherings of various fraternities; this law dissolved the Sufi Orders, prohibited the use of mystical names, titles and costumes pertaining to their titles, impounded the Orders' assets, and banned their ceremonies and meetings. The law also provided penalties for those who tried to re-establish the Orders. Two years later, in 1927, the Mausoleum of Mevlâna in Konya was allowed to reopen as a Museum.

In the 1950s, the Turkish government began allowing the Whirling Dervishes to perform once a year in Konya. The Mewlānā festival is held over two weeks in December; its culmination is on 17 December, the Urs of Mewlānā (anniversary of Rumi's death), called Šabe Arūs (شب عروس) (Persian meaning "nuptial night"), the night of Rumi's union with God. In 1974, the Whirling Dervishes were permitted to travel to the West for the first time. In 2005, UNESCO proclaimed "The Mevlevi Sama Ceremony" of Turkey as one of the Masterpieces of the Oral and Intangible Heritage of Humanity.

Religious denomination
As Edward G. Browne noted, the three most prominent mystical Persian poets Rumi, Sanai and Attar were all Sunni Muslims and their poetry abounds with praise for the first two caliphs Abu Bakr and Umar ibn al-Khattāb. According to Annemarie Schimmel, the tendency among Shia authors to anachronistically include leading mystical poets such as Rumi and Attar among their own ranks, became stronger after the introduction of Twelver Shia as the state religion in the Safavid Empire in 1501.

Eight hundredth anniversary celebrations

In Afghanistan, Rumi is known as Mawlānā, in Turkey as Mevlâna, and in Iran as Molavī.

At the proposal of the Permanent Delegations of Afghanistan, Iran, and Turkey, and as approved by its executive board and General Conference in conformity with its mission of "constructing in the minds of men the defences of peace", UNESCO was associated with the celebration, in 2007, of the eight hundredth anniversary of Rumi's birth. The commemoration at UNESCO itself took place on 6 September 2007; UNESCO issued a medal in Rumi's name in the hope that it would prove an encouragement to those who are engaged in research on and dissemination of Rumi's ideas and ideals, which would, in turn, enhance the diffusion of the ideals of UNESCO.

On 30 September 2007, Iranian school bells were rung throughout the country in honour of Mewlana. Also in that year, Iran held a Rumi Week from 26 October to 2 November. An international ceremony and conference were held in Tehran; the event was opened by the Iranian president and the chairman of the Iranian parliament. Scholars from twenty-nine countries attended the events, and 450 articles were presented at the conference. Iranian musician Shahram Nazeri was awarded the Légion d'honneur and Iran's House of Music Award in 2007 for his renowned works on Rumi masterpieces. 2007 was declared as the "International Rumi Year" by UNESCO.

Also on 30 September 2007, Turkey celebrated Rumi's eight-hundredth birthday with a giant Whirling Dervish ritual performance of the samāʿ, which was televised using forty-eight cameras and broadcast live in eight countries. Ertugrul Gunay, of the Ministry of Culture and Tourism, stated, "Three hundred dervishes are scheduled to take part in this ritual, making it the largest performance of sema in history."

Mawlana Rumi Review
The Mawlana Rumi Review is published annually by The Centre for Persian and Iranian Studies at the University of Exeter in collaboration with The Rumi Institute in Nicosia, Cyprus, and Archetype Books in Cambridge. The first volume was published in 2010, and it has come out annually since then. According to the principal editor of the journal, Leonard Lewisohn: "Although a number of major Islamic poets easily rival the likes of Dante, Shakespeare and Milton in importance and output, they still enjoy only a marginal literary fame in the West because the works of Arabic and Persian thinkers, writers and poets are considered as negligible, frivolous, tawdry sideshows beside the grand narrative of the Western Canon. It is the aim of the Mawlana Rumi Review to redress this carelessly inattentive approach to world literature, which is something far more serious than a minor faux pas committed by the Western literary imagination."

See also

General
 Blind men and an elephant
 Sant Mat
 Symphony No. 3 (Szymanowski)

Poems by Rumi
 Rumi ghazal 163

On Persian culture

 Iranian philosophy
 List of Persian poets and authors
Ferdowsi (c. 940–1020), poet, arguably the most influential figure in Persian literature
Hafez, Persian poet
 Persian literature
 Persian mysticism
 Tajik people

Rumi scholars and writers

 Hamid Algar
 Rahim Arbab
 William Chittick
 Badiozzaman Forouzanfar
 Hossein Elahi Ghomshei
 Fatemeh Keshavarz
 Majid M. Naini
 Seyyed Hossein Nasr
 Franklin Lewis
 François Pétis de la Croix
 Annemarie Schimmel
 Dariush Shayegan
 Abdolkarim Soroush
 Abdolhossein Zarinkoob

English translators of Rumi poetry

 Arthur John Arberry
 William Chittick
 Ravan A.G. Farhadi
 Nader Khalili
 Daniel Ladinsky
 Franklin Lewis
 Majid M. Naini
 Reynold A. Nicholson
 James Redhouse
 Shahriar Shahriari
 Shahram Shiva

References

Further reading

English translations
 Ma-Aarif-E-Mathnavi A commentary of the Mathnavi of Maulana Jalaluddin Rumi (R.A.), by Hazrat Maulana Hakim Muhammad Akhtar Saheb (D.B.), 1997.
 The Sufi Path of Love: The Spiritual Teachings of Rumi, by William Chittick, Albany: SUNY Press, 1983.
 The Mysteries of the Universe and Rumi's Discoveries on the Majestic Path of Love, by Majid M. Naini, Universal Vision & Research, 2002  www.naini.net
 The Mesnevi of Mevlâna Jelālu'd-dīn er-Rūmī. Book first, together with some account of the life and acts of the Author, of his ancestors, and of his descendants, illustrated by a selection of characteristic anecdotes, as collected by their historian, Mevlâna Shemsu'd-dīn Ahmed el-Eflākī el-'Arifī, translated and the poetry versified by James W. Redhouse, London: 1881. Contains the translation of the first book only.
 Masnaví-i Ma'naví, the Spiritual Couplets of Mauláná Jalálu'd-din Muhammad Rúmí, translated and abridged by E.H. Whinfield, London: 1887; 1989. Abridged version from the complete poem. On-line editions at sacred-texts.com, archive.org and on wikisource.
 The Masnavī by Jalālu'd-din Rūmī. Book II, translated for the first time from the Persian into prose, with a Commentary, by C.E. Wilson, London: 1910.
 The Mathnawí of Jalálu'ddín Rúmí, edited from the oldest manuscripts available, with critical notes, translation and commentary by Reynold A. Nicholson, in 8 volumes, London: Messrs Luzac & Co., 1925–1940. Contains the text in Persian. First complete English translation of the Mathnawí.
 Rending The Veil: Literal and Poetic Translations of Rumi, translated by Shahram Shiva Hohm Press, 1995 . Recipient of Benjamin Franklin Award.
 Hush, Don't Say Anything to God: Passionate Poems of Rumi, translated by Shahram Shiva Jain Publishing, 1999 .
 The Essential Rumi, translated by Coleman Barks with John Moyne, A.J. Arberry, Reynold Nicholson, San Francisco: Harper Collins, 1996 ; Edison (NJ) and New York: Castle Books, 1997 . Selections. Description of 2010 expanded edition. A much-cited poem therein is "The Guest House found in, for example, Mark Williams and Danny Penman (2011), Mindfulness, pp. 165–167. The poem is also at The Guest House by Rumi.
 The Illuminated Rumi, translated by Coleman Barks, Michael Green contributor, New York: Broadway Books, 1997 .
 The Masnavi: Book One, translated by Jawid Mojaddedi, Oxford World's Classics Series, Oxford University Press, 2004 . Translated for the first time from the Persian edition prepared by Mohammad Estelami with an introduction and explanatory notes. Awarded the 2004 Lois Roth Prize for excellence in translation of Persian literature by the American Institute of Iranian Studies.
 Divani Shamsi Tabriz, translated by Nevit Oguz Ergin as Divan-i-kebir, published by Echo Publications, 2003 .
 The rubais of Rumi: insane with love, translations and commentary by Nevit Oguz Ergin and Will Johnson, Inner Traditions, Rochester, Vermont, 2007, .
 The Masnavi: Book Two, translated by Jawid Mojaddedi, Oxford World's Classics Series, Oxford University Press, 2007. . The first ever verse translation of the unabridged text of Book Two, with an introduction and explanatory notes.
 The Rubai'yat of Jalal Al-Din Rumi: Select Translations Into English Verse, Translated by A.J. Arberry, (Emery Walker, London, 1949)
 Mystical Poems of Rumi, Translated by A.J. Arberry, (University of Chicago Press, 2009)
 The quatrains of Rumi: Complete translation with Persian text, Islamic mystical commentary, manual of terms, and concordance, translated by Ibrahim W. Gamard and A.G. Rawan Farhadi, 2008.
 The Soul of Rumi: A New Collection of Ecstatic Poems, translations by Coleman Barks, Harper One, 2002.
 The Hundred Tales of Wisdom, a translation by Idries Shah of the Manāqib ul-Ārefīn of Aflākī, Octagon Press 1978. Episodes from the life of Rumi and some of his teaching stories.
 Rumi: 53 Secrets from the Tavern of Love: Poems from the Rubaiyat of Mowlana Rumi, translated by Amin Banani and Anthony A. Lee (White Cloud Press, 2014) .

Life and work
 RUMI, JALĀL-AL-DIN. Encyclopædia Iranica, online edition, 2014.
 Dr Khalifa Abdul Hakim, "The metaphysics of Rumi: A critical and historical sketch", Lahore: The Institute of Islamic Culture, 1959. 
 Afzal Iqbal, The Life and thought of Mohammad Jalal-ud-Din Rumi, Lahore: Bazm-i-Iqbal, 1959 (latest edition, The life and work of Jalal-ud-Din Rumi, Kuala Lumpur: The Other Press, 2014). Endorsed by the famous Rumi scholar, A.J. Arberry, who penned the foreword.
 Abdol Reza Arasteh, Rumi the Persian: Rebirth in Creativity and Love, Lahore: Sh. Muhammad Ashraf, 1963 (latest edition, Rumi the Persian, the Sufi, New York: Routledge, 2013). The author was a US-trained Iranian psychiatrist influenced by Erich Fromm and C.G. Jung.
 Annemarie Schimmel, The Triumphal Sun: A Study of the Works of Jalaloddin Rumi, Albany: SUNY Press, 1993.
 Fatemeh Keshavarz, "Reading Mystical Lyric: The Case of Jalal al-Din Rumi", University of South Carolina Press, 1998. .
 Mawlana Rumi Review mawlanarumireview.com. An annual review devoted to Rumi. Archetype, 2010. .
 Seyyed Hossein Nasr, Islamic Art and Spirituality, Albany: SUNY Press, 1987, chapters 7 and 8.
 Majid M. Naini, The Mysteries of the Universe and Rumi's Discoveries on the Majestic Path of Love, Universal Vision & Research, 2002, 
 Franklin Lewis, Rumi: Past and Present, East and West, Oneworld Publications, 2000. 
 Leslie Wines, Rumi: A Spiritual Biography, New York: Crossroads, 2001 .
 Rumi's Thoughts, edited by Seyed G Safavi, London: London Academy of Iranian Studies, 2003.
 William Chittick, The Sufi Doctrine of Rumi: Illustrated Edition, Bloomington: World Wisdom, 2005.
 Şefik Can, Fundamentals of Rumi's Thought: A Mevlevi Sufi Perspective, Sommerset (NJ): The Light Inc., 2004 .
 Rumi's Tasawwuf and Vedanta by R.M. Chopra in Indo Iranica Vol. 60
 Athanasios Sideris, "Mevlana Celaleddin Rumi", an entry on Rumi's connections to the Greek element in Asia Minor, in the Encyclopedia of the Hellenic World – Asia Minor, 2003.
Waley, Muhammad Isa (2017). The Stanzaic Poems (Tarjī'āt) of Rumi. Critical Edition, Translation, and Commentary, with Additional Chapters on Aspects of His Divan. (School of Oriental and African Studies, London.)

Persian literature
 E.G. Browne, History of Persia, four volumes, first published 1902–1924.
 Jan Rypka, History of Iranian Literature, Reidel Publishing Company; 1968 . 
 "RUMI: His Teachings And Philosophy" by R.M. Chopra, Iran Society, Kolkata (2007).

External links

 
 
 
 
 Dar al Masnavi, several English versions of selections by different translators.
 Poems by Rumi in English at the Academy of American Poets
 Masnavi-e Ma'navi, recited in Persian by Mohammad Ghanbar

 
1207 births
1273 deaths
Iranian Sufis
Iranian Sunni Muslims
Hanafis
Maturidis
13th-century Muslim theologians
Islamic philosophers
Simple living advocates
Persian spiritual writers
Burials in Turkey
Sufi poets
13th-century Persian-language writers
Mevlevi Order
13th-century Iranian philosophers
Mystic poets
People from the Sultanate of Rum
13th-century Persian-language poets
13th-century Islamic religious leaders
Iranian Sufi saints
People from Balkh
Sufi mystics
Iranian Muslim mystics
Abu Bakr